South Point School and College, also known as SPSC, is a private school and college, founded in 2003, and based in Dhaka, Bangladesh. It has five branches, located in Baridhara, Malibagh, Mirpur, Banani and Uttara. The school was founded by Hamida Ali, former principal of Viqarunnisa Noon School and College.

In 2009, the institution was recognized as the best educational institution by the Dhaka Board of Education. The school often appears in different newspapers with Hamida Ali appearing in most of them, even appearing in the front page of a Bangladesh Pratidin newspaper in 2020.

History
The school was founded by M.A Rashid and Hamida Ali, who was also its first principal, in 2003. The first campus was in Niketon before it moved to Malibagh. 

In June 2020, during the COVID-19 pandemic, the college was criticised for arranging admission tests for English-medium students at the Malibagh campus. The school  reopened on 12 September, 2021 according to the orders of the Educational minister after 18 months of closure.

Campus
It has currently five campuses with the latest one being opened in Uttara in 2019.

The largest of all five campuses is the Baridhara campus. The campus accommodates classes play group to secondary levels across its ten-storey building. The Baridhara branch was used to run in a rented building before shifting to the new campus (own property) in 2019. The campus has a large playing ground beside it used for cricket, football and few other sports practice.

Curriculum
South Point School and College offers a complete primary, elementary, and secondary school program leading to the PEC, HSC, JSC and SSC examinations taken by the Bangladesh Government.

Only the Malibagh branch, Mirpur branch and Banani branch has English-medium and only the Banani branch is an only English-medium branch. The rest of the two branches either are English version, Bangla-medium or Bangla version.

Public examination result

Junior School Certificate (JSC)
The Junior School Certificate (JSC) examination result of South Point School and College from 2014 to 2018-

Secondary School Certificate (SSC)
The Secondary School Certificate (SSC) examination result of South Point School and College from 2014 to 2019-

Higher Secondary School Certificate (HSC)
The Higher Secondary School Certificate (HSC) examination result of South Point School and College from 2014 to 2018-

Activities

Sports
South Point School and College does not have any official team in any sports but sports like cricket, football, and badminton are widely practiced across branches. An official inter-school cricket tournament was supposed to take place in Baridhara campus's ground on March 17, 2020, due to Bangabandhu's 100th birthday celebration but was later cancelled due to schools closing in Bangladesh from March 17 due to the COVID-19 pandemic.

Annual sports day
An annual sports competition takes place each year between January to February. Every students does not get selected for the competition. Each student who wants to participate in the competition have to give test on their respective sports. For example, the one who will become first out of all in a marathon test will get qualified for the competition and not others. Different sports events takes in the competition including marathon (meter depends), "Morok lorai" etc. Assembly takes place before the competition starts.

Inter-school art competition
An inter-school art competition takes place in all five branches each year for each special occasions like Independence Day, Pahela Baishakh, Bangabandhu's birthday, Victory Day etc.

Extra-curricular activities (ECA)
The institute started extra-curricular activities classes in 2018. Before 2018, extra-curricular activities only included singing and drawing but after 2018, extra-curricular activities included dancing, debating, drawing, science projects, handwriting practices, singing etc. The extra-curricular activities classes takes place only on every Tuesday after the ending of main school classes. The practice of inter-school competitions and national competitions of dancing, singing etc. takes place through extra-curricular activities classes.

See also
 List of schools in Bangladesh
 Education in Bangladesh

References

External links
 spscdhaka.com

Schools in Dhaka District
Educational institutions established in 2002
2002 establishments in Bangladesh
Schools in Dhaka